Tomáš Sedláček may refer to:
Tomáš Sedláček (general) (1918–2012), Czech general
Tomáš Sedláček (economist) (born 1977), Czech economist
Tomáš Sedláček (footballer) (born 1984), Czech football player